Buy American Act, and closely worded terms, can refer to:

 Buy American Act, of 1933
 Buy America Provision, of the Surface Transportation Assistance Act of 1982
 Buy American Provision of the American Recovery and Reinvestment Act of 2009